Máximo González was the defending champion, but lost to Rubén Ramírez Hidalgo in the first round.

Andrej Martin won the title defeating Albert Montañés in the final, 0–6, 6–4, 7–6(8–6), after saving one match point in the tie-break.

Seeds

Draw

Finals

Top half

Bottom half

External links
 Main Draw
 Qualifying Draw

References

ATP Challenger 2001 Team Padova - Singles